Heinz Wewers (27 July 1927 – 29 August 2008) was a German footballer.

Club career 
He was the center half of the Rot-Weiß Essen team that won the German football championship in 1955 and the German Cup in 1953.

International career 
Between 1951 and 1958 Wewers earned 12 caps and scored 1 goal for the West Germany national team, and took part in the 1958 FIFA World Cup where the West Germans finished fourth.

References

External links
 
 
 
 

1927 births
2008 deaths
German footballers
Germany international footballers
Germany B international footballers
Rot-Weiss Essen players
1958 FIFA World Cup players
German football managers
Association football defenders
West German footballers
People from Gladbeck
Sportspeople from Münster (region)
Footballers from North Rhine-Westphalia